The Battle of Miranpur Katra was the decisive battle in the First Rohilla War.

References

Miranpur Katra
British East India Company
1774 in British India
Conflicts in 1774